Rotherham is a town in South Yorkshire, England.

Rotherham or Rotheram may also refer to:

Places
 Rotherham (UK Parliament constituency), the borough constituency covering the town
 Metropolitan Borough of Rotherham, including the town
 Rotherham, New Zealand, a village

People
 Alan Rotherham (1862–1898), English rugby union player
 Arthur Rotherham (1869–1946), English rugby union player
 Gerard Rotherham (1899–1985), English cricketer
 Hugh Rotherham (1861–1939), English cricketer
 Joseph Bryant Rotherham (1828–1910), British biblical scholar, minister of the Churches of Christ and prolific writer
 Roland Rotherham, British historian and lecturer
 Thomas Rotherham (1423–1500), English cleric and statesman, Archbishop of York and twice Lord Chancellor of England
 Edward Rotheram (1753–1830), a senior Royal Navy officer
 Steve Rotheram (born 1961), Metro Mayor of the Liverpool City Region and former UK Member of Parliament

Other uses
 HMS Rotherham (H09), a Second World War Royal Navy destroyer
 Baron Rotherham, an extinct title in the Peerage of the United Kingdom
 Rotherham United F.C., a football club based in the English town

See also
 Rotherham child sexual exploitation scandal